Zak Santiago (born January 3, 1981) is a Canadian actor and DJ.

Early life 
Santiago was born in Vancouver, British Columbia.

Career 
Santiago has appeared in many television shows, including Young Blades, Smallville, Robson Arms,  Flight 93, Dirk Gently's Holistic Detective Agency, Shut Eye, and The L Word. In December 2009, Santiago played the Ten of Clubs in the Syfy miniseries Alice. In 2013, he played Dominguez in the movie The Five People you Meet in Heaven.

He also plays Ramon, the dance instructor, restaurant owner, DJ, and wedding officiant in the Signed, Sealed, Delivered series. 

He also appeared in the episode "My Room" in season 1 of Dead Like Me, where he played an angry man who decided to kill the tattoo artist who had botched his tattoo. He had a lead role in The Assistants on The N in early 2009. He also appeared in the 2008 movie, The Eye, starring Jessica Alba.

Alongside his acting career, Santiago also works as a DJ.

Filmography

Film

Television

Awards and nominations
In 2004 Santiago won a Leo award for Best Supporting Performance by a Male in a Dramatic Series for his performance as Ramirez in Human Cargo.
He was nominated for Leo awards in 2006 for Young Blades episode "Enchanted", in 2013 for Random Acts of Romance and 2018 for Christmas Princess.

References

External links

1981 births
Living people
Canadian DJs
Canadian male film actors
Canadian male television actors
Canadian male voice actors
Canadian people of Portuguese descent
Male actors from Vancouver
Musicians from Vancouver